Marshall Edward Blume (31 March 1941 – 27 January 2019) was an American economist.

Blume studied mathematics at Trinity College and pursued postgraduate study in finance at the University of Chicago, where he completed a master's degree and doctorate. Blume was chief editor of the Journal of Finance from 1977 to 1980, and also served as editor of the Journal of Financial Economics, The Journal of Portfolio Management, and The Journal of Fixed Income. He co-founded Prudent Management Associates in 1982. Blume taught at the Wharton School of the University of Pennsylvania for 44 years. While on the faculty, he created Wharton's Online Trading and Investment Simulator and the Wharton Securities Exchange. He was appointed Howard Butcher Professor of Finance, and granted emeritus status upon retirement in 2010. In 2011, the Rodney L. White Center for Financial Research, where Blume had served as director since 1986, began awarding the Marshall Blume Prizes in Financial Research in his honor. Blume died in Easton, Maryland, on 27 January 2019.

References

1941 births
2019 deaths
20th-century American economists
21st-century American economists
The Journal of Finance editors
University of Chicago alumni
Trinity College (Connecticut) alumni
University of Pennsylvania faculty